Altai Krai Legislative Assembly election was held in Altai Krai on 19 September 2021 along with State duma elections in Russia.

68 deputies are elected according to the mixed electoral system. 34 deputies are elected according to party lists (proportional representation) for which a 5% threshold is established, and the distribution of seats between lists that received more than 5% of the vote takes place according to the formula. The other 34 deputies are elected in single-mandate constituencies (plurality voting), won by the majority of votes. The term of office is five years.

As of July 1, 2021, 1 792 470 voters were registered in the Altai Krai.

Candidates

Registration 
To register regional lists of candidates, parties need to collect voter signatures in the amount of 0.5%.

To register a candidate nominated in a single-mandate constituency, it is necessary to collect voter signatures in the amount of 3%.

The Election Commission of the Altai Territory published a list of 5 parties with the right to nominate their candidates, without collecting:

 United Russia
 Communist Party of the Russian Federation
 Liberal Democratic Party of Russia
 A Just Russia — For Truth
 Yabloko

By Party Lists

Single-member constituencies 

Politics of Altai Krai
Regional legislative elections in Russia
2021 elections in Russia